Hortensia Papadat-Bengescu (8 December 1876 – 5 March 1955 in Bucharest) was a novelist of the Romanian interwar period.

Life
Hortensia Bengescu was born in Ivești, Galați County, on 8 December 1876. She was the daughter of General Dimitrie Bengescu and of Zoe (born Stefǎnescu). She attended high-school in Bucharest and, aged 20, she married the magistrate Nicolae Papadat but her literary career was delayed because her husband was transferred from town to town (Turnu Măgurele, Buzău, Focşani, Constanţa) and because she had to take care of their four children: Nen, Zoe, Marcela and Elena. She died on 5 March 1955.

Works
Povârnişul (The Slope) – 1915;
Ape adânci (Deep Waters) – 1919;
Bătrânul (The Old Man) – 1920;
Sfinxul (Sphinx) – 1920;
Femeia în faţa oglinzii (The Woman in Front of the Mirror) – 1921;
Balaurul (The Dragon) – 1923;
Romanţă provincială (Provincial Romance) – 1925;
Fecioarele despletite (The Disheveled Maidens) – 1926;
Concert din muzică de Bach (A Concert of Bach's Music) – 1927;
Desenuri tragice (Tragic Drawings) – 1927;
Drumul ascuns (The Hidden Road) – 1933;
Logodnicul (The Fiancé) – 1935;
Rădăcini (Roots) – 1938;
Teatru (Selected Plays) – 1965: Bătrânul (The Old Man), A căzut o stea (A star has fallen), Medievala, Sora mea (My Sister), Ana

References

External links
 Biography

People from Galați County
Romanian novelists
Romanian women writers
Romanian dramatists and playwrights
Burials at Bellu Cemetery
1876 births
1955 deaths